Keppel Sands is a coastal rural town and locality in the Livingstone Shire, Queensland, Australia.

Geography 

Keppel Sands is the southernmost town on the Capricorn Coast.

Separated by Coorooman Creek from the larger towns of Emu Park and Yeppoon to the north, Keppel Sands is a charming village-style township centred on fishing and holiday making.  Facilities in Keppel Sands include a hotel, caravan park, motel, Australia Post outlet, local store, and two boat ramps.  The Coast Guard are located at Pumpkin Creek at the southern edge of the town.

Keppel Sands is home to many retirees and is a popular location for fishing and crabbing.

History

Originally known as Sandhills, the town takes its current name from Keppel Bay, which in turn was named on 27 May 1770 by Lieutenant James Cook , commander of HMS Endeavour, after Admiral Augustus Keppel, the First Lord of the Admiralty.

Keppel Sands has long been a popular beach to visit for people from Rockhampton and the surrounding area. Over the years beach huts and weekenders gradually gave way to the more permanent housing of today. Boarding houses were popular until the road improved and daytripping to the beach became possible. The Savoy Theatre was a place for both movies and dances.

Mount Barlow Provisional School opened in 1903 and became Mount Barlow State School on 1 Jan 1909. It was renamed Sandhills State School about 1930 and then renamed Keppel Sands State School about 1938.

Keppel Sands Post Office opened on 1 September 1927.

Near to Keppel Sands is Joskeleigh which was home to a large South Sea Islander community, imported as indentured labourers from various islands in Melanesia and Polynesia in a process known as blackbirding.

Between 2008 and 2013, Keppel Sands and the rest of Shire of Livingstone was within the Rockhampton Region.

Education 
Keppel Sands State School is a government primary (Prep-6) school for boys and girls at 1325 Keppel Sands Road.  In 2017, the school had an enrolment of 27 students with 3 teachers and 5 non-teaching staff (2 full-time equivalent). In 2018, the school had an enrolment of 28 students with 3 teachers and 5 non-teaching staff (2 full-time equivalent).

There are no secondary schools in Keppel Sands. The nearest government secondary school is Yeppoon State High School in Yeppoon to the north.

See also
 Capricorn Coast for comprehensive geography and history of Keppel Sands and surrounding districts

References

External links

 

Shire of Livingstone
Capricorn Coast
Towns in Queensland
Localities in Queensland